Jamestown station is a historic train station located at Jamestown in Chautauqua County, New York. Although no longer an active railroad station due to a lack of passenger service in the area after a restoration done in 2011 the building currently serves as a bus transportation center and community space for Jamestown. The first train arrived at Jamestown on August 25, 1860 as part of the Atlantic and Great Western Railroad.

The station is part of the National Comedy Center.

History
The station was constructed in 1931–32 for the Erie Railroad as a replacement for a much older station. It passed on to successor Erie Lackawanna Railroad in 1960 and continued to serve as a station for the railroad's long distance trains operating between Hoboken and Chicago. The last trains to use the station were the Atlantic Express/Pacific Express (discontinued, 1965) and the Lake Cities (discontinued, January 1970). On April 1, 1976 Erie Lackawanna became part of the Conrail system, which was taken over in turn by CSX Transportation and the Norfolk Southern Railway on June 1, 1999. Local railroad offices continued to occupy the building.

The station passed to private ownership and was slowly stripped of salvageable materials. In 1992, the Jamestown Urban Renewal Agency took ownership of the station with $120,000 in funding from the federal Community Development Block Grant program. It was listed on the National Register of Historic Places in 2003 as the Erie Railroad Station. Senator Charles Schumer announced grant monies to help restore the station as a commercial and transit hub on August 23, 2010. Upon completion of the $12 million (2012 USD) restoration, the restored station was opened to the public on October 26, 2012. At this point the station was re-named the Jamestown Gateway Station. 

In 2017, the National Comedy Center took over ownership of the station from the city and its associated agencies. The Jamestown station and surrounding area is now part of the National Comedy Center, which was opened in 2018.

Services
The Chautauqua Area Regional Transit System (CARTS) and Coach USA use the facility.

The station provides no Amtrak or commuter rail service. However, it is a stop for Amtrak's Thruway Motorcoach buses at a Chautauqua Area Regional Transportation Service bus shelter taking commuters to Buffalo's Exchange Street Station.

Gallery

See also
List of Erie Railroad structures documented by the Historic American Engineering Record
National Comedy Center

References

External links

Erie Railroad Station - Jamestown, New York - Train Stations/Depots on Waymarking.com

Jamestown, New York
Historic American Engineering Record in New York (state)
Buildings and structures completed in 1932
Railway stations on the National Register of Historic Places in New York (state)
Buildings and structures in Chautauqua County, New York
Former Erie Railroad stations
Art Deco architecture in New York (state)
Transportation buildings and structures in Chautauqua County, New York
Railway stations in the United States opened in 1860
Railway stations closed in 1970
1860 establishments in New York (state)
National Register of Historic Places in Chautauqua County, New York
Amtrak Thruway Motorcoach stations in New York (state)
Transit centers in the United States
Bus stations in New York (state)